Caloptilia chrysolampra is a moth of the family Gracillariidae. It is known from China, Japan (Honshū, Kyūshū, Shikoku), Korea and Taiwan.

The wingspan is 8.2–9.2 mm.

The larvae feed on Populus nigra and Salix species, including Salix babylonica and Salix pseudo-lasiopyne. They mine the leaves of their host plant.

References

chrysolampra
Moths of Asia
Moths described in 1936